

MPs by party

This is a list of the 250 members of the 2014–2016 National Assembly of Serbia, as well as a list of former members of this convocation of the assembly.

The 2012–2014 National Assembly was elected in the 2014 parliamentary election, and it first met on April 16, 2014. The 2014–2016 National Assembly was the tenth assembly since the reestablishment of the multi-party system, after the 1990 parliamentary election.

List of members of the 10th National Assembly at its dissolution

List of former members of the 10th National Assembly

References

 
sr:Десети сазив Народне скупштине Републике Србије